The Caldera Lauca is a caldera in the Arica y Parinacota Region of Chile. It is located in the Cordillera Occidental, in the valley of the Lauca River. The 21 mya Oxaya Ignimbrite originates in the caldera. The eastern border of the caldera is buried beneath younger ignimbrites and deposits but is located east of the Guallatiri volcano. An Oligocene fault marks the western edge of the caldera.

Rocks have varying SiO2 content from 58 to 73%. One sample of Lauca ignimbrite is younger than the Lauca caldera.

It forms one of the older volcanic centres in the Payachata region, together with the Ajoya-Choquelimpie volcanic complex and the Caquena domes, while Pomerape and Parinacota are more recent volcanic centres.

See also 

 Altiplano-Puna volcanic complex
 Lauca
 Guallatiri

References 

Calderas of Chile
Miocene calderas
Volcanoes of Arica y Parinacota Region